Tamás Nagy may refer to:

 Tamás Nagy (football coach), Hungarian football coach
 Tamás Nagy (footballer, born 1976), Hungarian footballer
 Tamás Nagy (footballer, born 1987), Hungarian footballer for Vasas SC
 Tamás Nagy (footballer, born 1988), Hungarian footballer for Lombard-Pápa TFC